The following table indicates the party of elected officials in the U.S. state of North Dakota:
Governor
Lieutenant Governor
Secretary of State
Attorney General
State Treasurer
State Auditor
State Insurance Commissioner
State Commissioner of Agriculture and Labor/State Agriculture Commissioner/State Labor Commissioner
State Tax Commissioner
Superintendent of Public Instruction

The table also indicates the historical party composition in the:
State Senate
State House of Representatives
State Public Service Commission
State delegation to the United States Senate
State delegation to the United States House of Representatives

For years in which a United States presidential election was held, the table indicates which party's nominees received the state's electoral votes.

1889–1916

1917–2000

2001–present

References

See also
Elections in North Dakota
Politics of North Dakota
List of political parties in North Dakota

Politics of North Dakota
Government of North Dakota
North Dakota